Elmwood is a house in Grafton, North Dakota that was built in 1895 in Late Victorian architecture.  It is located in an oxbow of the Park River.  It has also been known as Williamson House.  It was listed on the National Register of Historic Places in 1985.  The listing included two contributing buildings.

It was built by C.A.M. Spencer, who was North Dakota's second Attorney General.

References

Houses on the National Register of Historic Places in North Dakota
Victorian architecture in North Dakota
Houses completed in 1895
Houses in Walsh County, North Dakota
National Register of Historic Places in Walsh County, North Dakota
1895 establishments in North Dakota
Grafton, North Dakota